Odessa is a town in New Castle County, Delaware, United States. The population was 364 at the 2010 census.  Founded as Cantwell's Bridge in the 18th century, the name was changed in the 19th century, after the Ukrainian port city of the same name.  Today a significant part of the town is a historic district list on the National Register of Historic Places.

History
Odessa was originally known as Cantwell's Bridge. In 1721, a son of Captain Edmund Cantwell opened a toll bridge over the Appoquinimink Creek at this location. Cantwell's Bridge became an important port that shipped wheat, corn, tobacco, and produce down the creek to the Delaware Bay, where it traveled to distant ports. The town was also home to tanneries that produced leather goods. Cantwell's Bridge would continue to prosper as an agricultural port into the 19th century. In 1855, the grain trade collapsed after the Delaware Railroad was built to the west through Middletown. The railroad was originally proposed to be built through Cantwell's Bridge but the merchants and vessel owners in the town opposed. Following this, the town was renamed to Odessa after the port city of Odessa in Ukraine in an effort to keep the town alive as a major port. The town saw a slight boom during the American Civil War.

Geography
Odessa is located at  (39.4573340°N, 75.6613184°W), along the Appoquinimink River.

Infrastructure

Transportation

The Delaware Route 1 toll road is the most significant highway passing through Odessa. Its route follows the western edge of town, with an interchange with DE 299 that serves Odessa and neighboring Middletown. U.S. Route 13 passes through the heart of Odessa along Dupont Parkway, which follows 5th Street northbound and 6th Street southbound. Delaware Route 299 is the main east-west route in Odessa, passing through the town along Main Street. DART First State provides bus service to Odessa at a park and ride lot west of the town near the interchange between DE 1 and DE 299. The park and ride lot serves the Route 43 and Route 63 buses to Middletown, the Route 301 bus to Wilmington and Dover, and the seasonal Route 305 "Beach Connection bus to Lewes and Rehoboth Beach.

Utilities
Delmarva Power, a subsidiary of Exelon, provides electricity to Odessa. Chesapeake Utilities provides natural gas to the town. Trash and recycling collection is provided by the town.

Education
Odessa is within the Appoquinimink School District. Odessa High School is nearby.

MOT Charter School is an area charter school.

Demographics

At the 2000 census there were 286 people, 119 households, and 84 families living in the town. The racial makeup of the town was 94.06% White, 5.24% African American, 0.35% Pacific Islander, and 0.35% from two or more races. Hispanic or Latino of any race were 1.05%.

Of the 119 households 27.7% had children under the age of 18 living with them, 54.6% were married couples living together, 12.6% had a female householder with no husband present, and 29.4% were non-families. 22.7% of households were one person and 10.9% were one person aged 65 or older.  The average household size was 2.40 and the average family size was 2.80.

The age distribution was 19.9% under the age of 18, 5.9% from 18 to 24, 26.9% from 25 to 44, 29.4% from 45 to 64, and 17.8% 65 or older.  The median age was 42 years. For every 100 females, there were 95.9 males.  For every 100 females age 18 and over, there were 90.8 males.

The median household income was $53,269 and the median family income  was $55,938. Males had a median income of $31,875 versus $33,750 for females. The per capita income for the town was $27,662.  None of the families and 3.2% of the population were living below the poverty line.

See also
Odessa Historic District

References

External links

 Town of Odessa, official website

Towns in New Castle County, Delaware
Towns in Delaware
Ukrainian communities in the United States